33rd Street is a bus rapid transit station in Arlington, Virginia. It is located near the intersection of 33rd Street South and Potomac Avenue, along the dedicated bus-only highway portion of the Metroway bus rapid transit line, providing two-way service along the route.

History 
33rd Street opened on April 17, 2016.

Station layout
The station consists of two side platforms along a dedicated bus-only highway, which opened on April 17, 2016.

References

External links
 Official Metroway site

Metroway
Bus stations in Virginia
2016 establishments in Virginia
Transport infrastructure completed in 2016
Crystal City, Arlington, Virginia